Julfa, Jolfa or Culfa may refer to:
Jolfa, Iran (city), a city in the East Azerbaijan Province of Iran
Julfa, Azerbaijan (city), the capital of the Julfa Rayon
Jolfa County, an administrative subdivision of East Azerbaijan Province of Iran
Julfa District, a region in the Nakhchivan Autonomous Republic of Azerbaijan
New Julfa, an Armenian quarter in Isfahan, Iran
Armenian cemetery in Julfa, a destroyed Armenian cemetery in Julfa